George Mason University (Mason) School of Business is the business school of George Mason University, a state university in Virginia, United States. The School of Business has campuses located in Fairfax, Arlington, and Herndon, VA.

Mason's School of Business is accredited by the Association to Advance Collegiate Schools of Business (AACSB) International.

The School of Business offers undergraduate and graduate programs in the fields of:  accounting, finance, marketing, and other business related specialties.

In the 2021 U.S. News & World Report, Mason's Part time MBA was ranked #48, tie with Purdue University. The School of Business was ranked in 2014 in U.S. News & World Report on the following lists: Mason's MBA program was ranked #68 on the "Best Part-time MBA" list, Mason's Online EMBA program was #75 on the "Best Online Graduate Business Program" list, and The School of Business was #72 on the list of "Best Undergraduate Business Programs."
 
The School of Business also offers study abroad opportunities to students seeking international business experiences. China and France are two of the countries the School of Business works with for their study abroad program.

Some of the School of Business' corporate partners include IBM, KPMG, Deloitte, PwC, UiPath and Fedbid. These partnerships allow the students to have excellent networking opportunities with highly influential names in the world of business. In 2020, UiPath, an automation software company, donated $16.4 million in software for Mason School of Business students.

The School of Management officially changed its name to The School of Business on July 15, 2014.

References

External links
School of Business Official website
GMU Official website